Retro Jams was a music video network that played music videos from the 1960s, 1970s, 1980s, and early 1990s, with the vast majority of clips used in the public domain to reduce rights fees. Established in 2007, it was owned and operated by now-defunct Equity Media Holdings. Retro Jams was formerly carried full-time as a free-to-air TV channel on Galaxy 18 (Ku band DVB-S, 123°W) and on various Equity-owned terrestrial low-power television stations nationwide.

The "Retro Jams" name and branding have also been used  by Retro Television Network to refer to two individual programming blocks, "Retro Jams" and "Retro Jams by Request".

History 
Retro Jams was established in December 2007 by Equity Media Holdings to provide music video programming to a few individual, local Equity-owned stations which lacked a conventional television network affiliation. Programming consisted primarily of music videos from the 1980s and early 1990s.

On most of these stations, Equity replaced Retro Jams with the Retro Television Network in mid-2008. As Equity had founded RTN and owned the network until 2008, the "Retro Jams" name was moved to individual RTN programming blocks "Retro Jams" and "Retro Jams by Request" when the full-channel music video format was dropped. While most affected stations (such as KCBU and KEGS-LP) simply replaced Retro Jams with RTN, a few stations went to other networks. WEVU-CA switched to Univision affiliation and K25DM was operated as an independent station.

The "Retro Jams" name and branding was then used by the Retro Television Network to refer to two programming blocks:
 Retro Jams, an individual RTN program.
 Retro Jams by Request, another individual television program.

Cash-strapped Equity Media Holdings sold Retro Television Network to Luken Communications in June 2008 and entered federal chapter 11 bankruptcy protection in Little Rock, Arkansas in December 2008. An option allowing Equity to re-purchase RTN from Luken expired unexercised on December 24, 2008. Equity continued to provide broadcast automation facilities and operate RTN on behalf of Luken Communications until January 2009, when Equity's failure to pay RTN's programming suppliers caused Luken Communications to move RTN to independent facilities.

RTN was permanently removed from all Equity-owned or operated stations on January 4, 2009.

While many of the affected stations replaced RTN with This TV, classic cinema or similar content, Equity returned the full-channel Retro Jams to the air in January 2009 in order to provide programming to the remaining Equity-owned stations. This all-music video format continued until what remained of Equity's equity was liquidated and the individual stations sold at auction later that same year.

Retro Jams and the associated Equity Broadcasting free-to-air satellite television feeds on Galaxy 18 (Ku band, 123°W) are now silent.

While RTN is a trademark of the Retro Television Network, there is no record of any registered trademark on the Retro Jams name by either RTN or Equity.

See also 
 Equity Media Holdings
 Retro Television Network

References

Defunct television networks in the United States
Equity Media Holdings
Music video networks in the United States
Television channels and stations established in 2007
Television channels and stations disestablished in 2009